Eriolarynx is a genus of flowering plants in the family Solanaceae, found in Peru, Bolivia and northern Argentina. Their trumpet-shaped flowers are pollinated by hummingbirds, and to a lesser extent, bees.

Species
Currently accepted species include:
Eriolarynx australis (Griseb.) J.M.H.Shaw
Eriolarynx fasciculata (Miers) Hunz.
Eriolarynx iochromoides (Hunz.) Hunz.
Eriolarynx lorentzii (Dammer) Hunz.

References

Solanaceae
Solanaceae genera